Jarvis James Hayes (born August 9, 1981) is an American-Qatari college basketball coach who is currently an assistant coach for the Georgia State Panthers and is a former professional player. Hayes was selected by the Washington Wizards with the 10th overall pick of the 2003 NBA draft.

College career 

Jarvis Hayes was born five minutes ahead of his twin brother, Jonas Hayes. After a high school career at Douglass High School in Atlanta, he (and Jonas) enrolled first at Western Carolina, where Jarvis became the first freshman in 40 seasons to lead the Southern Conference in scoring.

After a year, he transferred to Georgia, where he was named First Team All-SEC in both his sophomore and junior years. He became the first Bulldog to be so honored since Dominique Wilkins in 1981–82. He also stepped up in big games, averaging 28.5 points per game during the two games Georgia played in the 2002 NCAA tournament.

Hayes holds the rare distinction of having led two different conferences in scoring while in college.

Professional career

NBA career 
He was taken 10th in the 2003 NBA draft by the Washington Wizards, to back up Jerry Stackhouse, to come in off the bench and provide that deep range. Hayes averaged 13.0 points and 4.3 rebounds through the first three games of the season but hit the 'rookie wall' within a month. He was the Wizards' only representative at the season's All-Star Weekend in Los Angeles when he made the Rookie-Sophomore challenge. By season's end, he had made through a tough season and sported some solid numbers in spite of missing 12 games with various injuries. In that rookie season, he averaged 9.6 points while making 42 starts and playing an average of 29.2 minutes.

Hayes did well in his second season, filling in for Larry Hughes, averaging 10.2 points a game, until a night in February when he and Manu Ginobili bumped knees. A few games later, Hayes went up for a dunk against the Sacramento Kings and when he came down, his right knee had split completely open. For a year, he hoped things would get better without surgery. In his recovery period from the injury, he ballooned to 245 pounds reviewing local area restaurants with Washingtonian Magazine Food Critic Tom Head on a weekly radio segment.

In his third season, at a preseason game at Wake Forest, Hayes scored 18 points in the first half of a preseason matchup with the San Antonio Spurs on Tobacco Road. After that game, his right knee, which forced him to miss a third of the 2004–05 season after he fractured his kneecap, swelled through the night. Hayes missed the remainder of the preseason. Later, on December 16, 2005, he had to leave a Laker game. The knee had fractured again and again his season was over. On February 14, 2006, he had the long-delayed surgery with the pins.

In the 2006–07 season, he played 81 games, but only averaged 7.2 points, shot only 41% overall, but better than 36% from the three and 84.5% from the line. In the Wizards' injury plagued first round loss to the Cavs, he had started all four games, averaging 10.5 and 3.5 but shot only 32.6%. Even with a 29-point effort in the double triple-double overtime loss to the Nets in April 2007, he clearly was not the same player. Although he still had the ability to make his off-balance jump shots, he seemed to shy away from contact. From filling the lanes on the fast break as a healthy rookie he often settled for shots on the perimeter.

The Wizards declined to offer Hayes a contract after the 2006–07 season. On August 15, 2007, after four years with the Wizards, Hayes signed a contract for the veteran's minimum with the Detroit Pistons. Hayes became a player in the Pistons rotation, serving as the main backup for starter Tayshaun Prince. He averaged 6.7 points in  15.7 minutes, improved on his shooting numbers, and had another 29-point effort again as his best game.

Hayes signed with the New Jersey Nets on July 16, 2008. He became the team's 6th man, he also learned to play the power forward position during the season.

Hayes' final NBA game was played on April 9, 2010 in a 127 - 116 win over the Chicago Bulls where he played for 9 minutes and recorded 2 points and 1 steal.

European career 
In January 2011, Hayes joined the Turkish club Aliağa Petkim. In July 2011, he signed a one-year deal with BC Krasnye Krylya Samara in Russia.

In February 2013, he joined the Israeli club Ironi Ashkelon.

On September 16, 2013, he signed a one-year deal with the Italian club Sidigas Avellino.

Qatari national team
Hayes became a naturalized citizen of Qatar, and presently plays for the senior men's Qatari national basketball team. He led the Qatar national team with 25 points, in an 87–64 win over Hong Kong, during group play of the 2013 FIBA Asia Championship in Manila, Philippines.

Personal life
Hayes and his wife Illia were married in 2008. The couple has two boys, Jarvis Jr., and Myles.

NBA career statistics

Regular season 

|-
| align="left" | 
| align="left" | Washington
| 70 || 42 || 29.2 || .400 || .305 || .786 || 3.8 || 1.5 || 1.0 || .2 || 9.6
|-
| align="left" | 
| align="left" | Washington
| 54 || 22 || 28.9 || .389 || .341 || .839 || 4.2 || 1.7 || .9 || .2 || 10.2
|-
| align="left" | 
| align="left" | Washington
| 21 || 13 || 24.6 || .421 || .362 || .833 || 3.6 || 1.3 || .8 || .0 || 9.3
|-
| align="left" | 
| align="left" | Washington
| 81 || 17 || 20.1 || .410 || .361 || .845 || 2.6 || 1.0 || .6 || .2 || 7.2
|-
| align="left" | 
| align="left" | Detroit
| 82 || 1 || 15.7 || .431 || .376 || .750 || 2.2 || .8 || .6 || .1 || 6.7
|-
| align="left" | 
| align="left" | New Jersey
| 74 || 1 || 24.8 || .445 || .385 || .692 || 3.6 || .7 || .7 || .1 || 8.7
|-
| align="left" | 
| align="left" | New Jersey
| 45 || 9 || 23.0 || .421 || .335 || .778 || 2.4 || .9 || .6 || .2 || 7.8
|- class="sortbottom"
| style="text-align:center;" colspan="2"| Career
| 427 || 115 || 23.2 || .415 || .356 || .798 || 3.1 || 1.1 || .7 || .1 || 8.3

Playoffs 

|-
| align="left" | 2007
| align="left" | Washington
| 4 || 4 || 34.8 || .326 || .368 || .857 || 3.5 || 1.0 || .5 || .3 || 10.8
|-
| align="left" | 2008
| align="left" | Detroit
| 11 || 0 || 5.5 || .300 || .357 || .000 || 1.5 || .4 || .1 || .2 || 2.1
|- class="sortbottom"
| style="text-align:center;" colspan="2"| Career
| 15 || 4 || 13.3 || .316 || .364 || .857 || 2.0 || .5 || .2 || .2 || 4.4

References

External links
NBA.com Profile 

Eurocup Profile
Eurobasket.com Profile
Turkish Basketball League profile
Hayes: From Injury-Prone to Ironman?

1981 births
Living people
African-American basketball players
Aliağa Petkim basketball players
American expatriate basketball people in Israel
American expatriate basketball people in Italy
American expatriate basketball people in Romania
American expatriate basketball people in Russia
American expatriate basketball people in Turkey
American men's basketball players
Basketball coaches from Georgia (U.S. state)
BC Krasnye Krylia players
CSU Asesoft Ploiești players
Detroit Pistons players
Georgia Bulldogs basketball players
Ironi Ashkelon players
New Jersey Nets players
Qatari men's basketball players
Qatari people of African-American descent
Naturalised citizens of Qatar
Small forwards
Basketball players from Atlanta
S.S. Felice Scandone players
Washington Wizards draft picks
Washington Wizards players
Western Carolina Catamounts men's basketball players
21st-century African-American sportspeople
20th-century African-American people